The John Adam Squire House is a historic house in Palo Alto, California. It was built in 1904-1905 for John Adam Squire, a Greek professor. Squire lived here with his wife Georgina and their three daughters until his death in 1930. His wife died in 1959.

The house was designed by architect T. Paterson Ross in the Neoclassical architectural style. It has been listed on the National Register of Historic Places since March 6, 1972.

References

Houses in Palo Alto, California
Houses on the National Register of Historic Places in California
National Register of Historic Places in Santa Clara County, California
Greek Revival architecture in California
Houses completed in 1904